Ziroobwe–Wobulenzi Road is a road in Central Uganda, connecting the towns of Ziroobwe to Bamunanika and Wobulenzi, all in Luweero District.

Location
The coordinates of the road near Bamunanika are 0°41'50.0"N, 32°36'20.0"E (Latitude:0.697222; Longitude:32.605556).

Overview
As far back as 2008, when the Gayaza–Ziroobwe Road was designated, the Ugandan government planned to tarmac the Ziroobwe–Wobulenzi Road. In June 2014, the Uganda National Roads Authority (UNRA) carried out an assessment to determine the individuals, families and businesses who will be displaced by the road works, with a view to compensate them. As at November 2014, the project was still in "preparation" stage.

Points of interest
The following points of interest also lie along or near the road:

1. The town of Ziroobwe, with estimated night-time population of 5,000 in 2012.

2. The Bamunanika Place of the Kabaka of Buganda is located in Bamunanika town.

3. Gayaza–Ziroobwe Road joins Ziroobwe–Wobulenzi Road in the middle of Ziroobwe town.

4.

5. The western end of this road at Wobulenzi lies approximately 
 south of Katikamu SDA Secondary School, a mixed boarding secondary school.

See also
 List of roads in Uganda
 Transport in Uganda

References

External links
Website of Uganda National Roads Authority

Roads in Uganda
Luweero District
Central Region, Uganda